The first case of HIV in a woman was recorded in 1981. Since then, numerous women have been infected with the HIV/AIDS virus. The majority of HIV/AIDS cases in women are directly influenced by high-risk sexual activities, injectional drug use, the spread of medical misinformation, and the lack of adequate reproductive health resources in the United States. Women of color, LGBTQ women, homeless women, women sex workers, and women intravenous drug users are at an extremely high-risk for contracting the HIV/AIDS virus. In an article published by the Annual Review of Sociology, Celeste Watkins Hayes, an American sociologist, scholar, and professor wrote, "Women are more likely to be forced into survival-focused behaviors such as transactional sex for money, housing, protection, employment, and other basic needs; power-imbalanced relationships with older men; and other partnerings in which they cannot dictate the terms of condom use, monogamy, or HIV."

From the start of the HIV/AIDS epidemic in the U.S., women have been excluded and erased from the medical, governmental, and societal institutions that aim to prevent and treat HIV/AIDS. Initially, the medical community in the U.S. deemed lesbian, bisexual and queer women, as well as women who have sex with women (WSW), immune to the HIV/AIDS virus. Although this was later corrected, the spread of such false information had resulted in many women engaging in high risk sexual activities, due to the belief that they were unable to contract the HIV/AIDS virus. Lesbian, bisexual, and queer women who become infected with HIV/AIDS are statistically classified in the U.S. as heterosexual, intravenous drug, or indefinable transmission, despite the fact that it could have been contracted from another woman. Lesbian, bisexual, and queer women who are infected with the HIV/AIDS virus through sexual assault by men are also statistically categorized as heterosexual transmission. Women with HIV/AIDS have been excluded from medical studies, clinical trials, financial grants, reproductive health resources, and an adequate HIV education. Women with the HIV/AIDS virus got less attention from medical, governmental, and societal institutions because of the focus on men with the HIV/AIDS virus.


History 
Historically, women have often been excluded from HIV and AIDS advocacy, treatment, and research. At the start of the AIDS epidemic in 1981, medical and scientific communities did not recognize women as a group for research. Women were excluded from clinical trials of medication and preventative measures. Part of the pharmaceutical industry's hesitation to involve women in drug studies was fear of liability, stemming from the catastrophic results of the thalidomide drug trials in the 60s, which caused serious birth defects in thousands of children whose mothers had partaken in the trial, resulting in hundreds of millions of dollars in legal settlements. Women were often blocked from partaking in clinical research with exclusionary with restrictions like "no pregnant or non-pregnant women". The National Institutes of Health (NIH) rejected grants that were targeted at understanding HIV in low-income women of ethnic minorities. Due to lack of research, the CDC's definition of AIDS didn't include gynecological conditions until 1994, meaning many women were previously ineligible for SSI benefits.

The first case of HIV in a woman in the US was reported in 1981.
In December 1982, the first cases of mother-to-child HIV transmission were recorded. The number of children infected with the virus increased throughout the decade. Zidovudine (ZDV), alternatively named azidothymidine (AZT), was introduced as a drug to treat HIV in the late 1980s, reducing the chance of mother-to-child transmission by up to 70%.

, women account for about 20% of reported HIV cases. The two major modes of transmission to women are heterosexual sexual intercourse and intravenous drug use.

Women can transmit the HIV/AIDS virus to other women through sexual intercourse. However, the U.S. does not statistically categorize HIV/AIDS transmission in forms other than heterosexual, intravenous drug, or indefinable transmission. Due to lack of research, statistics on women-to-women transmission of HIV is unknown. Whether or not a woman had sex with a woman is missing from over 60% from all HIV medical reports in the U.S.

Timeline

External links 

 Audiopedia on: Why_is_is_even_more_important_for_me_as_a_woman_to_protect_me_from_HIV_and_AIDS

References 

HIV/AIDS
Women's health